Metwaly or variants Metwali, Metwally and Metwalli (Arabic: متولي) is a surname that means he who takes charge. Notable people with the surname include:

Metwaly
Ibrahim Metwaly, Egyptian lawyer and human rights activist, member of the Egyptian Commission for Rights and Freedoms
Mazen Metwaly (born 1990), Egyptian swimmer

Metwalli
Mahmoud Metwalli (born 1993), Egyptian footballer
Mustafa Metwalli (1949—2000), Egyptian actor

Metwally
Mariam Ibrahim Metwally (born 1996), Egyptian squash player
Omar Metwally (born 1974), American actor

See also
 Sayed Metwally Complex, a training center of Egyptian multi-sport club Al-Masry SC
 Metwallis (matāwila), older name for Lebanese Shia Muslims